Maidstone Town Hall is a municipal building in Middle Row, Maidstone, Kent, England. The town hall, which is a meeting place of Maidstone Borough Council, is a Grade II* listed building.

History
The first courthouse in the town was erected, for the purposes of hearings of the quarter sessions and assizes, in the Middle Row in 1587. Civic leaders held their meetings in a room on the first floor the lower courthouse. In 1608, a second courthouse, which known as the "upper courthouse", was erected a few yards to the east of the original courthouse, which was subsequently referred to as the "lower courthouse". The upper courthouse was generally used for the assizes while the quarter sessions continued to held in the lower courthouse.

In the late 18th century civic leaders decided to erect a new town hall on the site of the lower courthouse which was duly demolished in 1759.  The new town hall was financed from a combination of public subscription and contributions from the justices. It was designed in the neoclassical style, built with Portland stone on the ground floor and red brick above and was completed in 1763. The design involved a symmetrical main frontage with five bays facing onto the High Street; it originally had arcading on the ground floor to allow markets to be held; a council chamber with pedimented windows was established on the first floor. The central section of three bays, which slightly projected forward, was topped with a pediment from which a clock projected. There was a cupola with Ionic order columns, which was capped with a gilded ball and a weather vane, at roof level. Internally, the principal room was the council chamber, which featured a fine Rococo ceiling. A prison cell was established above the council chamber: prisoners who were detained there while awaiting deportation applied graffiti to the walls. The gaol was closed in around 1827, apparently after the escape of a prisoner being held there, and the arcading on the ground floor was enclosed to create a police court sometime after 1835.

By 1898, the town hall was already too small for the needs of the growing town, with the local directory stating that the building was "a miserable specimen of the poverty-stricken architecture of those days, possessing no room adequate to the needs of a large town, and necessitating the scattering of the offices of the Corporation." However, the town hall remained the main meeting place of Maidstone Municipal Borough Council until council offices were established at Tonbridge Road in the 1960s, and the council chamber in the town hall is still used by its successor body, Maidstone Borough Council, for committee meetings.

See also
Grade II* listed buildings in Maidstone (borough)

Notes

References

Government buildings completed in 1763
City and town halls in Kent
Buildings and structures in Maidstone
Grade II* listed buildings in Kent